Graham Calder Mullen (born 1940) is a senior United States district judge of the United States District Court for the Western District of North Carolina.

Education and career

Born in Gastonia, North Carolina, Mullen received a Bachelor of Arts degree from Duke University in 1962 and a Juris Doctor from Duke University School of Law in 1969. He was a Lieutenant in the United States Navy from 1962 to 1966. He was then in private practice in Gastonia, North Carolina from 1969 to 1990.

Federal judicial service

On February 20, 1990, Mullen was nominated by President George H. W. Bush to a seat on the United States District Court for the Western District of North Carolina vacated by Judge James Bryan McMillan. Mullen was confirmed by the United States Senate on September 10, 1990, and received his commission on September 11, 1990. He served as Chief Judge from 1998 to 2005. He assumed senior status on December 1, 2005.

References

Sources

1940 births
Living people
Judges of the United States District Court for the Western District of North Carolina
United States district court judges appointed by George H. W. Bush
20th-century American judges
Duke University School of Law alumni
United States Navy officers
Lawyers from Charlotte, North Carolina
21st-century American judges